Thiemo de Bakker and Mark Vervoort won the title, by beating Paolo Lorenzi and Fernando Romboli by a walkover.

Seeds

Draw

Draw

References
 Main Draw

Monterrey Challenger - Doubles